Anodonthyla vallani is a species of microhylid frog. The frog was discovered in Madagascar and was previously confused with Anodonthyla nigrigularis. This species is only found in high elevation forests of the Ambohitantely Reserve.

References

External links
 

Anodonthyla
Endemic frogs of Madagascar
Amphibians described in 2010
Fauna of the Madagascar subhumid forests